In this list of presidents of the United States by age, the first table charts the age of each president of the United States at the time of presidential inauguration (first inauguration if elected to multiple and consecutive terms), upon leaving office, and at the time of death.

Age of presidents

The median age at inauguration of incoming U.S. presidents is 55 years. The specific years and days median is 55 years and 104.5 days, which falls midway between how old Warren G. Harding was in 1921 and Lyndon B. Johnson was in 1963.

The youngest person to assume the presidency was Theodore Roosevelt, who, at the age of 42, succeeded to the office after the assassination of William McKinley. The youngest to become president by election was John F. Kennedy, who was inaugurated at age 43. The oldest person to assume the presidency was Joe Biden, the nation's current president, who was inaugurated at age 78.

Assassinated at age 46, John F. Kennedy was the youngest president at the end of his tenure, and his lifespan was the shortest of any president. At age 50, Theodore Roosevelt was the youngest person to become a former president. The oldest president at the end of his tenure was Ronald Reagan at 77; this distinction will eventually fall upon Joe Biden, who is currently .

James K. Polk had the shortest retirement of any president, dying  months after leaving office at age 53 (the youngest president to die of natural causes). Jimmy Carter's retirement, now  years, is the longest in American presidential history. At age , Carter is also the oldest living president as well as the nation's longest-lived president. The youngest living president is Barack Obama, age .

Presidential age-related data

Notes

Graphical representation
This is a graphical lifespan timeline of the presidents of the United States. They are listed in order of office, with Grover Cleveland listed in the order of his first presidency.

The following chart shows presidents by their age (living presidents in green), with the years of their presidency in blue. The vertical blue line at 35 years indicates the minimum age to be president.

References

Sources
 Frank Freidel and Hugh S. Sidey, "The Presidents of the United States". The White House.
 Robert S. Summers, "POTUS: Presidents of the United States". Internet Public Library.

United States, Presidents
Age
United States presidents and death